Katherine "Katie" Follett (former married name Mackey, born November 12, 1987) is an American middle-distance runner. She placed 8th at 2018 IAAF World Indoor Championships – Women's 3000 metres.

Career

2018 season
Mackey won a US national xc title over 6 km in 19:35 at 2018 USATF National Club Cross Country Championships.

Mackey placed 6th in the 5000 m in 15:39.25 at 2018 USA Outdoor Track and Field Championships.

Mackey finished 2nd in the 3,000 meters at the 2018 USA Indoor Track and Field Championships, qualifying her for the 2018 IAAF World Indoor Championships where she placed 8th.

2017 season
In 2017, Mackey won the U.S. road mile championship.

2016 season
She finished 6th at the 2016 United States Olympic Trials (track and field) in the 5,000 meters.

2015 season
Mackey placed 6th in 5000 m final in 15:16.96 at 2015 USA Outdoor Track and Field Championships

Mackey won the 2015 Stockholm Bauhaus Athletics 3,000 meter 2015 IAAF Diamond League event.

2014 season
Mackey placed 3rd in 1500 m final in 4:07.70 at 2014 USA Outdoor Track and Field Championships.

Mackey won a silver medal at the 2014 IAAF World Relays in the women's 4 × 1500 metres relay.

Mackey placed 8th in 5000 m at the 2014 IAAF Continental Cup in the 5000 m.

2013 season
Katie Mackey placed 8th in 15:57.78 in the 5000 m final and 9th in 4:32.10 in the 1500 m final at the 2013 USA Outdoor Track and Field Championships.

2012 season
Katie Mackey placed 11th in the 1500 m at the 2012 United States Olympic Trials (track and field) in 4:11.46 and DNS in 5000 m.

2008 season
Katie Follett placed 21st in the 1500 m at the 2008 United States Olympic Trials (track and field) in 4:22.60.

College career
At the University of Washington Mackey was an eight-time All-American.

Prep
Katie Follett won the Elanor Troxell Award in 2006 as Fort Collins' top student-athlete.

Katie Follett an 11-time conference champion, 13-time regional champion, and 11-time all-state performer in both cross country and track for Fort Collins High School.

Katie set Fort Collins school records in the 3200 m (10:47.51) and 3200 m relay, and at 5 km in cross country (18:16).

Personal life
Katie met Danny Mackey in February 2011 and they were married on New Year's Eve in 2011. He became her coach in 2012. She moved back to Colorado in 2019 and her current coach is Jeff Boelé. In September 2021, Follett had a son named Joshua.

References

External links

 
 

1987 births
Living people
Sportspeople from Fort Collins, Colorado
American female middle-distance runners
American female long-distance runners
University of Washington alumni
Washington Huskies women's track and field athletes
World Athletics Championships athletes for the United States
21st-century American women